France Bleu Picardie is one of the public service regional radio stations of France Bleu. It serves the departments of Somme, most of Oise and Aisne, and is also accessible in the south of Pas-de-Calais.

History 
The station began broadcasting in 1985 under the name  before the creation of France Bleu in 2000.

Since May 2016, France Bleu Picardie has been broadcasting its programs in Beauvais and northern Oise.

References 

Radio stations in France
French-language radio stations
1985 establishments in France
Radio stations established in 1985